Beyond the Garden is a 1996 Spanish drama film directed by Pedro Olea from a screenplay by Mario Camus, based on the novel of the same name by Antonio Gala. It stars Concha Velasco.

Cast

Production
Beyond the Garden is a Sogetel and Lola Films production, and it had the participation of Canal+ and Soqepaq. Talking about this film, Concha Velasco recalled the envy of all her colleagues on the set for having a scene in the car with a naked Manuel Bandera "and on top" of her, also scantily clad. "The seamstresses, the makeup artists, the hairdressers... they all told me how lucky I was and asked me how he had 'that'," she said amused. Locations in Senegal were used to portray a Rwandan refugee settlement.

Release 
Distributed by Sogepaq, the film was theatrically released in Spain on 20 December 1996. It opened on 53 screens and grossed $279,216 for the week, placing eighth at the Spanish box office.

Accolades 

|-
| align = "center" rowspan = "5" | 1997 || rowspan = "5" | 11th Goya Awards || Best Adapted Screenplay || Mario Camus ||  || rowspan = "5" | 
|-
| Best Actress || Concha Velasco || 
|-
| Best Supporting Actress || Mary Carrillo || 
|-
| Best New Actress || Ingrid Rubio || 
|-
| Best Production Supervision || Carmen Martínez || 
|}

See also 
 List of Spanish films of 1996

References

External links 

1996 drama films
1996 films
Spanish drama films
Films directed by Pedro Olea
1990s Spanish films
1990s Spanish-language films
LolaFilms films
Films shot in Senegal
Films set in Rwanda
Films based on Spanish novels